To the Last Breath: Three Women Fight for the Truth Behind a Child's Tragic Murder, written by author and journalist Carlton Stowers, recounts the true story of the mysterious death of a two-year-old child. Initially the infant's death was said to be of natural causes, but further investigation revealed that the child was suffocated by her father.

Critical reception
Booklist praised Stowers for his "masterful chronicle of a troubling case."
The book won the Edgar Award for Best Fact Crime in 1998.

References

1998 non-fiction books
Edgar Award-winning works
Non-fiction books about murders in the United States
St. Martin's Press books
Violence against children